is a Japanese football player for Gainare Tottori.

Club statistics
Updated to 23 February 2018.

References

External links

Profile at Gainare Tottori

1998 births
Living people
Association football people from Hiroshima Prefecture
Japanese footballers
J3 League players
Gainare Tottori players
Association football defenders